Vendore is a village in the Thrissur district of Kerala, India. 
Vendore is situated in between Amballur and Mannampetta. 
Vendore comes under AlagappaNagar GramaPanchayat and the nearest town is Amballur, about 2 km away. The football ground 'Alagappanagar Football Ground' is in Vendore. Vendore is also famous for St Mary's Church and Nambooriyachan Temple . One of the old known mills, Alagappanagar Textile Mill, is also located here. The Panchayath office is located in Vendore nearer to the Veterinary Hospital.

History

The name Vendore came from the group of peoples who came and settled from Kodungallur due to Tippu Battle years ago. Since they were doing trade of Manjal others started calling them Manjaly.

Educational institutions

 Thiagarajar Polytechnic College, Alagappanagar
 St. Francis Xavier LP School
 St. Mary's LKG and UKG
 Alagappanagar High School

References

Villages in Thrissur district